Fu Yiwei (born March 28, 1997 in Jilin City, Jilin) is a Chinese female curler.

Teams

Women's

Mixed doubles

References

External links

1997 births
Living people
Chinese female curlers
Sportspeople from Jilin City
21st-century Chinese women